Fernando Ezequiel Andreoli (born March 25, 1978) is an Argentine former footballer who played for clubs from Chile, Bolivia and Peru as well as his native Argentina. He played as a right full back.

Titles
 Banfield 2000–01 (Primera B)

References

External links
 
 

1978 births
Living people
Argentine footballers
Argentine expatriate footballers
Argentina international footballers
Club Atlético Huracán footballers
Club Atlético Tigre footballers
Club Atlético Banfield footballers
All Boys footballers
Club Atlético Atlanta footballers
Independiente Rivadavia footballers
The Strongest players
Juan Aurich footballers
Sport Boys footballers
C.D. Huachipato footballers
Expatriate footballers in Chile
Expatriate footballers in Peru
Expatriate footballers in Bolivia
Association football defenders
People from Morón Partido
Sportspeople from Buenos Aires Province